Jamnagar South is one of the 182 Legislative Assembly constituencies of Gujarat state in India. It is part of Jamnagar district and covers a major area of Jamnagar Municipal Corporation.

List of segments
This assembly seat represents the following segments,

 Jamnagar Taluka (Part) – Jamnagar Municipal Corporation (Part) Ward No. – 6, 7,8,9,10,11,12,13,14,15,16,17.

Members of Legislative Assembly

Election results

2022

2017

2012

See also
 List of constituencies of Gujarat Legislative Assembly

References

External links
 

Assembly constituencies of Gujarat
Jamnagar district